Maes Down is a 0.2 hectare geological Site of Special Scientific Interest between Shepton Mallet and Stoney Stratton in Somerset, notified in 1985. It is a Geological Conservation Review site.

The rocks seen at Maes Down were laid down about 190 million years ago, during the Upper Pliensbachian and Lower Toarcian Stages of the Jurassic Period of geological times, when this part of Britain lay beneath the sea.

References

 English Nature citation sheet for the site (accessed 10 August 2006)

External links
 English Nature website (SSSI information)

Sites of Special Scientific Interest in Somerset
Sites of Special Scientific Interest notified in 1985
Geology of Somerset